Kamionka  is a village in the administrative district of Gmina Glinojeck, within Ciechanów County, Masovian Voivodeship, in east-central Poland.

References

Villages in Ciechanów County